Thessaloniki A is an electoral constituency of the Hellenic Parliament. With an electorate of 531,732 eligible voters (as of 2019) in the urban area of Thessaloniki, Central Macedonia, it elects sixteen members of parliament.

The constituency was formed in 1958, when the former Thessaloniki constituency was divided in two, with the remaining municipalities of the Thessaloniki regional unit (until 2010, Prefecture) constituting Thessaloniki B.

Election results

Members of Parliament

Current Members of Parliament

Members of Parliament (September 2015 – June 2019) 
The following sixteen MPs have been elected in the Greek legislative election, September 2015:

Members of Parliament (January 2015 – August 2015)
The following sixteen MPs had been elected in the Greek legislative election, January 2015 

Ioannis Amanatidis SYRIZA
Despoina Charalampidou SYRIZA
Ioanna Gaitani SYRIZA
Tasos Kourakis SYRIZA
Triantafyllos Mitafidis SYRIZA
Kyriaki Tektonidou SYRIZA
Alexandros Triantafyllidis SYRIZA	
Konstantinos Gioulekas ND
Stavros Kalafatis ND
Kostas Karamanlis ND
Eleni Rapti ND
Antonios Gregos XA
Christina Tachiaou The River
Athanasios Vardalis KKE
Konstantinos Zouraris Independent Greeks
Evangelos Venizelos PASOK

Members of Parliament (June 2012-2015)

Kostas Karamanlis ND
Konstantinos Gkioulekas ND
Stavros Kalafatis ND
Eleni Rapti ND
Giannis Ioannidis ND
Georgios Orfanos ND
Anastasios Kourakis SYRIZA
Ioannis Amanatidis SYRIZA
Despoina Charalampidou SYRIZA
Ioanna Gaitani SYRIZA
Evangelos Venizelos PASOK
Gavriil Avramidis ANEL
Chrysoula-Maria Giatagana Independent Greeks
Asimina Xirotyri-Aikaterinari DIMAR
Antonios Gregos XA
Theodosios Konstantinidis KKE

European Parliament election

Notes and references

External links
   Results and Elected MPs for the September 2015 Election in Thessaloniki A constituency (from the website of the Hellenic Ministry of Interior)

Parliamentary constituencies of Greece
1958 establishments in Greece
Constituencies established in 1958
Politics of Thessaloniki